Mina Sadati (born ) is an Iranian actress. She is best known for her role as Leila in Loneliness of Leila (2015).

Filmography

Film

Web

Television

Theater

Awards and nominations

References

External links 

 Mina Sadati Cannes Film Festival
 

1981 births
Living people
People from Tehran
Feminist artists
Iranian feminists
Actresses from Tehran
Iranian film actresses
University of Tehran alumni
Iranian television actresses